TV3 Latvia is a Latvian commercial television channel targeted at a Latvian language audience owned by All Media Baltics, a company owned by investment firm Providence Equity Partners.

History

TV3 was launched in 1998, but did not receive a terrestrial license until 2001. The channel has since increased its viewing share to become the most popular channel in Latvia as of September 2007, surpassing its then-closest rival LNT.

Until 2013, there was a free terrestrial TV channel, since 2014 it became a paid channel, terrestrial TV. Initially, it was planned to leave the free channel, already in 2012, but the media regulator forbade it. Changes took place along with LNT. 

The network also has four sister channels: TV3 Life (lifestyle programming), TV3 Mini (children's programming), TV3 Sport and TV3 Film.

TV3, as with other channels of the All Media Baltics group in the Baltic states, switched to HD broadcasting on 26 July 2018.

Programming
Acquired programming on TV3 include CSI: Crime Scene Investigation, CSI: Miami, CSI: NY, Bones, Castle, Lie to Me, Servant of the People and several other shows. The channel also features many Latvian programmes, including the news programme TV3 Ziņas (TV3 News), Degpunktā (In the spotlight), investigative news programme Nekā personīga (Nothing Personal) and TV series UgunsGrēks, Svešā seja, and Viņas melo labāk.

Logos

See also
 List of Latvian television channels
 TV3 (Viasat)

References

External links
Official website
Viasat Latvia

Television channels in Latvia
TV3 Latvia
Television channels and stations established in 1998
All Media Baltics